The Hebron Governorate is an administrative district of Palestine in the southern West Bank.

This makes the Hebron Governorate the largest of 16 governorates in both population and land area in the Palestinian territories. The city of Hebron is the district capital or muhfaza (seat) of the governorate. The governor is Hussein al-Araj and its district commander is Abdel Fattah al-Ju’eidi.

During the first six months of the First Intifada 42 people in Hebron Governorate were killed by the Israeli army.

Localities
The Hebron Governorate has a total of seven cities and eighteen towns. The governorate also contains more than 100 Bedouin villages and settlements that are not listed below.

Cities
 Dura
 Halhul
 Hebron (capital)
 Yatta
 ad-Dhahiriya
al-samou

Municipalities
The following localities have municipality status from the Ministry of Local Government of the Palestinian National Authority.

 Bani Na'im
 Beit 'Awwa
 Beit Ula
 Beit Ummar
 Deir Sammit
 Idhna
 Kharas

 Nuba
 Sa'ir
 as-Samu
 Surif
 Tarqumiya
 Taffuh

Village councils
The following have populations over 1,000 persons.

 Sikka, Palestine
 Al Baqa
 Beit 'Amra
 Beit Einun
 Beit Kahil
 Beit ar-Rush al-Fauqa
 al-Burj
 Deir al-'Asal al-Fauqa
 ad-Duwwara
 Hadab al-Fawwar
 al-Heila
 Hureiz
 Imreish
 Karma
 al-Karmil
 Khalet al-Maiyya
 Khursa
 Ruq'a
 al-Kum
 Khirbet Safa
 Khirbat al-Simia
 Kuseis
 al-Majd
 Qalqas
 Qila
 al-Ramadien
 ar-Rihiya
 ash-Shuyukh
 Shuyukh al-Arrub
 as-Sura
 at-Tabaqa
 al-Uddeisa
 Zif

Refugee camps
 al-Arroub
 al-Fawwar

See also
 Governorates of Palestine

References

External links 
Hebron Governorate Statistical Yearbook No. 3 (2011)

 
Governorates of the Palestinian National Authority in the West Bank